Talla is a town and comune in the province of Arezzo, Tuscany (Italy).

References